Gjelten is a surname. Notable people with the surname include: 

Esten Gjelten (born 1942), Norwegian biathlete
Per Gjelten (1927–1991), Norwegian nordic skier 
Tom Gjelten (born 1948), American broadcaster